Cavemen is a Russian segment of Sesame Street produced by Francesco Misseri, which ran through 2000 until 2012.

Characters

"Brown": A mischievous and somewhat conceited who is obsessed with problems. He is somewhat of a coward, although his best friend, Red, always causes him trouble. He has brown hair and eyebrows and two teeth on the top of his mouth, which causes him to grin. Voiced by Eric Jacobson.

"Red": A cute and good-natured caveman who is somewhat shy.  Although he is considered to his patience, he sometimes likes to blush. He has red hair and eyebrows, a rosy complexion, round cheeks and sometimes wears a white and black pygmy necklace around his neck. He also doesn't have any teeth. Voiced by Joey Mazzarino.

Segments
Cave Compassion (2000/2004)
Umbrella Sharing (2000/2003)
Cavemen Share a Chair (2003)
Cave Whistling (2004)
Cave Basketball (2004)
Opening the Door (2007)
War and Peace (2009)

Segment info

"Opening the Door": Red chases a butterfly and Brown is sniffing flowers, when suddenly a door appears. Each caveman opens the door, but they have another idea. They push on the door many times, but give up. Red pulls out a key, which surprises Brown. He tries to fit the key to the door, but throws it away. Suddenly, a doorbell appears, and Brown rings it. The door finally opens, Red puts a hand on his tummy, and he and Brown go in and out the door, which they are so happy.

"Sandcastle Making": Brown and Red are making sandcastles. Brown pulls out a knight on his horse, and Red pulls out a dragon. They each add cannons, but eventually Red knocks over Brown's figurine. Brown then knocks over Red's figurine. Red gets so mad he wrecks his sandcastle. Then Brown wrecks up his sandcastle, too. Finally, Red gives Brown a hug, and they make a new sandcastle. They are now happy.

"Basketball": Brown and Red spot a pretty butterfly, until Brown pulls out a basketball hoop, which surprises Red. They wonder if they could throw a basketball, and then Red holds a rock, but it lands on Brown's foot. Then, Brown turns into a basketball, which makes Red laugh. Red turns into a basketball, too. They said they could throw each other into the hoop. Red thinks going in the air is fun.

"Poor Red": Red and Brown are playing with blocks together, when suddenly, Brown trips and falls and the block he is holding starts to land and smite Red on the foot, which hurts real bad. The poor caveman walks away, sobbing. Red is holding his hurt foot and Brown tells him he's sorry. But Red ignores him. After Red's foot stops hurting, he takes a nap. Brown tries his best to think, but soon he digs a hole and pulls out some flowers. When Red is still sleeping, Brown tries to give him flowers, but he gives up and throws them away. Suddenly, a wind passes by, which wakes up the sleeping caveman, causing him to shiver and whimper and his tummy hurting. Brown then covers him with a blanket, which makes him comfortable. Red's eyes open and is now happy and thanks Brown for helping him.

"Whistling": Red is thinking he could "whistle a happy tune through the whole planet". Red whistles, which surprises Brown. Red giggles, then whistles again. Brown keeps telling Red to make him whistle, but Red keeps whistling many times. Brown tries to whistle, but all that comes out is air. The poor caveman starts sobbing loudly which makes Red shocked. With tears streaming down his cheeks, Brown whimpers. Red tries to comfort him and whistles for him, which makes him happy. Brown tries his best to whistle but then lets out a whistle. He and Red are happy and laugh. At the end, all cavemen whistle together.

"Sharing a Chair": Brown and Red walk up tired and sweating. Brown tries to sit on a rock, but it is too flat. Red notices a cactus and then sits on it. Suddenly, the thorns pinch his rear end, causing him to scream and land on his tummy. He then pulls out a chair to Brown's surprise. Brown asks if he can sit in the chair, but Red ignores him. Brown sit's on a turtle's shell with a turtle's head peeking out, and drives him off the ground. Brown asks Red if he could sit in the chair with him. Both cavemen try to sit in the chair, but fall off. Brown has another idea. He pulls out a present for Red: a cuckoo with a turning hand. A smile spreads across Red's cheeks as he and Brown watch the clock and soon decide to take it to Red's house.

"Umbrella Sharing": Red and Brown are sitting under a rock on a sunny day, until some storm clouds appear and a lightning strike frightens them. They look up and they could see a drop appear. It is raining. Brown covers himself with a small rock, while Red hides under a large rock. Brown throws away the small rock, and pulls out an umbrella, which surprises Red. Red asks if he could cover himself with something. Brown walks away, until Red squirts his face with a hose, and then rubs his eyes and asks if he could share the umbrella with Brown, and Brown says yes. All cavemen are happy while sharing the umbrella.

Sesame Street segments
1970s Soviet television series
Russian children's animated television series
Soviet animated television series
Television series about cavemen